Olga Lagrange-Gerlach, née Olga Gerlach, (1 November 1874 in Metz – 20 January 1949 in Munich at age 74) was a German mezzo-soprano.

References

Sources 
 Karl-Josef Kutsch, Leo Riemens: Großes Sängerlexikon. Vol. 33, Directmedia Publ., Berlin, 2000.

External links 
  Olga Lagrange-Gerlach

1874 births
1949 deaths
Musicians from Metz
People from Alsace-Lorraine
Lorraine-German people
German operatic mezzo-sopranos
20th-century German women singers